Corinna is a census-designated place (CDP) and the primary village in the town of Corinna, Penobscot County, Maine, United States. It is in the southern part of the town, on both sides of the East Branch Sebasticook River, part of the Kennebec River watershed.

Several state highways pass through the village. Maine State Route 7 enters from the south as Newport Road and departs to the north as Dexter Road. State Route 11 enters from the south with Route 7, but leaves to the northeast on Exeter Road, leading  to Exeter Center. State Route 43 enters from the west on St. Albans Road and leaves to the northeast with Route 11. State Route 222 leads southeast out of Corinna on Stetson Road, leading  to Stetson.

Corinna was first listed as a CDP prior to the 2020 census.

Demographics

References 

Census-designated places in Penobscot County, Maine
Census-designated places in Maine